Kolín is a town in the Central Bohemian Region of the Czech Republic. It has about 32,000 inhabitants. The town centre is well preserved and is protected by law as an urban monument reservation.

Administrative parts

Kolín is made up of town parts of Kolín I–VI and of villages of Sendražice, Šťáralka, Štítary and Zibohlavy.

Etymology
The name Kolín probably comes from the Old Czech verb koliti, i.e. "to hammer poles", and is related to the location of Starý Kolín in the often flooded area at the confluence of Klejnárka and Elbe. The soil in the vicinity of the confluence was strengthened with the help of wooden poles.

Geography
It lies in a fertile landscape of the Central Elbe Table lowland. The town is located on the Elbe River. In the eastern part of the municipal territory is Sandberk, an artificial lake created by flooding a sandstone quarry.

History
Ptolemy's world map mentions Budorgis in the Kolín's area in the 2nd century.

Kolín was founded by King Ottokar II of Bohemia in the 13th century by relocation, when Starý Kolín ("Old Kolín") was threatened by floods and the king decided to move the settlement. The first written mention of Kolín is from 1261, when it was mentioned that Přelouč obtain town privileges, same as Kolín and Kouřim have. It lay on a trade route Prague–Český Brod–Čáslav–Moravia.

In 1437–1438, a castle was founded in Kolín. It was built on ruins of a burned down monastery. During the Thirty Years' War, it was damaged, and in the 17th century, it was rebuilt to a brewery. In 1911, the castle burned down and its Renaissance look disappeared.

The 1757 Battle of Kolín was fought during the Seven Years' War, and in 1944 a refinery in Kolín was bombed during the Oil Campaign of World War II. Zyklon B for Nazi concentration camps was produced there.

Demographics

Economy

In Kolín is the smaller part of Kolín-Ovčáry Industrial Zone, known mostly for the factory of the automobile manufacturing company Toyota Motor Manufacturing. As of 2020, TMM employed 2,400 people and it is the most important employer in the region.

Kolín is home to the packaging and paper manufacturer, OTK company.

Sights
The historical centre of the town has many gothic and baroque buildings. Most notable are the main market (Karlovo Square) with the Neo-Renaissance town hall, and Church of Saint Bartholomew from the 13th century, rebuilt in 1360 by the architect Peter Parler.

In Kolín there is the original Jewish ghetto with a synagogue from 1696. It is the second oldest and most valuable synagogue in Bohemia. The Jewish cemetery is one of the oldest and largest Jewish cemeteries in Bohemia. It was established in the first half of the 15th century.

Notable people

Jakub Krčín (1535–1604), pond and dam constructer
Jean-Gaspard Deburau (1796–1846), Czech–French actor and mime
František Kmoch (1848–1912), composer and conductor; worked and died here
Julius Petschek (1856–1932), industrialist
Josef Svatopluk Machar (1864–1942), poet
Václav Radimský (1867–1946), painter
Terezie Brzková (1875–1966), actress
Robert Saudek (1880–1935), graphologist and writer
Otokar Fischer (1883–1938), playwright, translator and poet
Josef Sudek (1896–1976), photographer
Václav Morávek (1904–1942), soldier and war hero
Ludmila Dvořáková (1923–2015), operatic soprano
Frank Daniel (1926–1996), Czech-American screenwriter and film director
Jan Kubíček (1927–2013), constructivist painter and sculptor
Jiří Balcar (1929–1968), graphic artist, painter and illustrator
Luboš Dobrovský (1932–2020), politician and journalist
Eva Randová (born 1936), operatic mezzo-soprano
Miloš Zeman (born 1944), President of the Czech Republic
Jan Novák (born 1953), Czech-American novelist and playwright
Jarda Svoboda (born 1966), musician
Bohdan Ulihrach (born 1975), tennis player
Petr Čáslava (born 1979), ice hockey player
Barbora Poláková (born 1983), actress and singer

Twin towns – sister cities

Kolín is twinned with:
 Dietikon, Switzerland
 Duino-Aurisina, Italy
 Érd, Hungary
 Kamenz, Germany
 Lubań, Poland
 Rimavská Sobota, Slovakia

References

External links

Kolín pictures

 
Cities and towns in the Czech Republic
Populated places in Kolín District
Oil campaign of World War II
Populated riverside places in the Czech Republic
Populated places on the Elbe